Dithalama desueta is a moth of the  family Geometridae. It is found in Western Australia.

References

Moths described in 1902
Scopulini